Michael Chang was the defending champion, but lost in the quarterfinals to Kelly Evernden.

Brad Gilbert won the title, by defeating Anders Järryd 7–5, 6–2 in the final.

Seeds

Draw

Finals

Top half

Bottom half

References

External links
 Official results archive (ATP)
 Official results archive (ITF)

Singles